Taillefaire may refer to

Lady Callista Taillefaire, character in novels by Laura Kinsale

See also
Germaine Tailleferre (1892 - 1983), French composer